May Murr, sometimes written as Mayy Murr (1929–2008) was a Lebanese professor, historian, writer, poet, and political activist.

Before taking up writing, May Murr taught several subjects at several universities and institutions in Lebanon such as the Lebanese University and the Lebanese Army Military Academy, in which she taught mathematics, literature, history, history of art and geography.

She began professionally writing and publishing her works in 1967, as well as founding and presiding over many cultural and social associations. She was a member of the Société des Gens de Lettres de France and of the Société Teilhard de Chardin, headquartered in Belgium, the Academy of American Poets, and a Distinguished Member of the New York-based International Society of Poets. She was also the President of the Academy of Lebanese Thought and was a founding member of the ultranationalist political party the Guardians of the Cedars.

She figures among the women poets in the Anthologie de la Poésie Féminine Mondiale. Many international critics have praised her poetry. Jean Cayrol wrote to her: 'May Murr, you are filled with poetry to infinity', while Lebanese poet Said Akl wrote, in 1967, an article entitled 'A woman invades the conscience of Lebanon':
Jean Cayrol wrote to her: May Murr, you are filled with poetry to infinity.

Early life and education
The younger sister of Lebanese member of parliament Michel Murr, Murr was born in 1929 to a Greek Orthodox Christian family in the Matn District village of Bteghrine. She studied history and geography and has a diploma in both from the Lebanese Academy of Fine Arts, and in 1973 she obtained her degree in geography from the University of Lyon, France.

Publications
May Murr has written more than 3,000 articles on several subjects (theology, philosophy, politics, literature, arts, history, geography, social problems...) with an emphasis on the problems of the family, womanhood and childhood, in most of the major Lebanese newspapers and magazines, in three languages: Lebanese Arabic, French and Standard Arabic.

She was the editor-in-chief of the weekly Lebnan since its creation in 1975 until 1982. She published in this weekly political articles, poems and extracts from Lubnaniyada, her epic poem in Lebanese Arabic (of some 30,000 verses) and historical essays which allowed her to call the history of Lebanon-Phoenicia the Giant of Histories, and to entitle her works on the history of Lebanon in 12 volumes (still manuscript) Lebanon-Phoenicia, Land of God.

In Lebanese Arabic
Elissa: a historical drama in verse, considered as a summit in this field. Beirut, 1968.
I love You: Love poems (in neo-Lebanese characters) Editions St Paul, 1978.
Various publications in prose and poetry in the press.

In French
Pourquoi les Roses? Love poems (in both classical and free verses), Paris, Grassin, 1967.
Penchent Leur Tête les Epis: Poems (in both classical and free verses), Paris, Grassin, 1969. Paris, Grassin, 1967.
Il S'agit d'un Rien d'Amour: Prayers (in free verse), Paris, Grassin, 1970.
Quatrains: Poems (in classical verse), Paris, Grassin — Jounieh, St Paul, 1971.
Kamal or the Story of a Hero: Poetry and prose, with a prayer in verse as an introduction. Beirut, Ishtar, 1987.
Poésie Trismégiste: Spiritual Poems (in classical verse), Etablissements Khalifé pour l'Impression, Beirut, 1994.

In Standard Arabic
The Most Beautiful Tales of Lebanon-Phoenicia. Beirut.
The Magic Birdie.
The Time Vessel.
Lebanon and Phoenicia.
Thor and Maya.
The Emerald Temple.
I Shall Give Your Name to Tyre.
The One Who Restored the Empire of the World to the Phoenicians.
Tripoli, I prefer you to myself.
He Meant Us for Love.
Elissa, Founder of the Queen of Our Emporia's.
Sidon Returns from Death.
Euclid of Tyre, Organizer of the Mind.

May Murr has also published in the press three collections of Arabic classical poems:
 My God, I love You.
 Lebanon also I love.
 A Kiss for You.

Unpublished works

Many manuscripts written in collaboration with her husband, Alfred Murr (deceased 2005), await publication:
Jesus. An epic poem in Lebanese Arabic of some 15,000 verses.
The First Love Letter, or Thor and Maya. A historical novel
Cadmus of Tyre. The Universal Master. A historical novel.
He Meant Us for Love, or Adoniram, Solomon and the Queen of Sheba. A historical novel.
Euclid of Tyre, Organizer of the Mind. A historical novel in Arabic.
Several novels, plays (including Marina), and nine books of poetry.

Recognition 

 Gens de lettres de France (1968), 
 Prix de la Rose des poètes, Paris (1969)
 The Said Akl prize (1970)
 The Fakhr al-Din Prize, awarded by General Aziz Ahdab for her contributions to the study of Lebanese history (1974)
 Grand Prix Europa (1999)

See also
Phoenicianism
Guardians of the Cedars
Lebanese Arabic
Said Akl

References

1929 births
2008 deaths
20th-century Lebanese historians
Lebanese women poets
Lebanese activists
Eastern Orthodox Christians from Lebanon
Academic staff of Lebanese University
Phoenicianists
20th-century Lebanese poets
20th-century Lebanese women writers
Women historians